Per ("Pelle") Anders Gustaf Holmertz (born 3 February 1960 in Motala, Östergötland) is a former freestyle swimmer from Sweden. He won a silver medal in the 100 m freestyle at the 1980 Summer Olympics.

He is not a sibling of the accomplished swimmer Anders Holmertz, although they are both from the same town. In 2006, Holmertz was inaugurated into the University of California at Berkeley's Hall of Fame for his numerous wins and records for the school's swimteam in the early eighties.  Holmertz graduated with a degree in economics from Cal in 1983.

Personal bests

Long course (50 m)

Clubs
Motala SS
Stockholmspolisens IF

References
Profile

1960 births
Living people
People from Hallstahammar Municipality
Swimmers at the 1980 Summer Olympics
Olympic swimmers of Sweden
Swedish male freestyle swimmers
World Aquatics Championships medalists in swimming
European Aquatics Championships medalists in swimming
Motala SS swimmers
Stockholmspolisens IF swimmers
Medalists at the 1980 Summer Olympics
Olympic silver medalists for Sweden
Olympic silver medalists in swimming
Sportspeople from Västmanland County